Flemming Alfred Kjærsgaard (born 12 July 1945) is a Danish former footballer who played as a forward. He made six appearances for the Denmark national team from 1968 to 1970.

References

External links
 
 

1945 births
Living people
Danish men's footballers
Association football forwards
Denmark international footballers
Denmark youth international footballers
Denmark under-21 international footballers
Akademisk Boldklub players
K.V. Mechelen players
Danish expatriate men's footballers
Danish expatriate sportspeople in Belgium
Expatriate footballers in Belgium
Footballers from Copenhagen